Headway is the amount of time between two vehicles passing through a given point in transportation systems.

Headway may also refer to:

 Headway UK, a UK-based charity of which Headway Devon is affiliated
 Headway (band), a UK Britpop band